Clarkia rubicunda is a flowering plant endemic to California. It is found mostly on the Central Coast part of the state. The plant is known by the common names Ruby Chalice Clarkia and Farewell to Spring.

Clarkia rubicunda bears attractive poppy-like blooms with wide, cup-shaped corollas of four pink or purplish petals. The corolla of the flower sometimes has a bright red center. As the common name suggests, it blooms in June and July.

It is similar in appearance to another flower of genus Clarkia, the Clarkia amoena, also called "Farewell to Spring".

References

Further reading
Bartholomew, B., L. C. Eaton, and P. H. Raven. (1973). Clarkia rubicunda: A Model of Plant Evolution in Semiarid Regions. Evolution, 27(3) 505–517.

External links
Jepson Manual Treatment — Clarkia rubicunda
Clarkia rubicunda — U.C. Photos

rubicunda
Endemic flora of California
Natural history of the California chaparral and woodlands
Natural history of the San Francisco Bay Area
Plants described in 1836
Flora without expected TNC conservation status